Events in the year 1902 in Ireland.

Events
 2 January – The South Irish Horse cavalry was formed as the South of Ireland Imperial Yeomanry.
 7 January – Waterford Corporation passed a motion to confer the freedom of the city on John Redmond.
 8 January – The Great National Convention took place in the Round Room of the Rotunda Hospital in Dublin. Motions were passed regarding coercion, the Irish language and evicted tenants.
 2 April – John Redmond was awarded the freedom of the City of Dublin.
 Spring to autumn – The Cork International Exhibition (1902) was held.
 22 May – The White Star Liner SS Ionic was launched by Harland and Wolff in Belfast.
 2 June – The centenary of the Congregation of Christian Brothers was celebrated with High Mass in the Holy Name Cathedral, Chicago.
 22 July – Thomas Croke died at the age of 78 in Thurles. Roman Catholic Archbishop of Cashel since 1875, he was the first patron of the Gaelic Athletic Association and a supporter of the Gaelic League and the Land League.
 August – The first part of the cliff path at The Gobbins, Islandmagee, was opened.
 26 November – Ireland's Own magazine was launched.
 The Dunraven land conference started.
 The Roman Catholic St Brendan's Cathedral, Loughrea, was completed.

Arts and literature
  2 April – W. B. Yeats's play Cathleen Ní Houlihan was first performed in Dublin.
 Michael McCarthy's Priests and People in Ireland was published.
 The Irish Literary Theatre project ended.
 Padraic Colum's anti-enlistment play, The Saxon Shillin' , was awarded a prize by Cumann na nGaedheal. 
 Percy French wrote the comic song Are Ye Right There Michael?
 Augusta, Lady Gregory, published Cuchulain of Muirthemne, a retelling of Irish mythology in English.
 Walter Osborne painted his last work, Tea in the Garden, in Dublin.

Sport

Football
 International
 22 February – Wales 0–3 Ireland (in Cardiff)
 1 March – Ireland 1–5 Scotland (in Belfast)
 22 – March Ireland 0–1 England (in Belfast)
 Irish League
 Winners: Linfield F.C.
 Irish Cup
 Winners: Linfield F.C. 5–0 Distillery F.C.

Births
 2 January – Dan Keating, Ireland's oldest man and last surviving veteran of the Irish War of Independence (died 2007)
 13 January – Francis Connell, cricketer (died 1983).
 20 January – Kevin Barry, Irish Republican Army member (executed for his part in an operation resulting in the deaths of three British soldiers 1920).
 26 February – Jim Hurley, veteran of the Irish War of Independence, Cork Gaelic footballer and hurler (died 1965).
 25 April – Cormac Breslin, Fianna Fáil party Teachta Dála (TD) and Ceann Comhairle of Dáil Éireann (died 1978).
 29 April – Francis Stuart, writer (died 2000).
 20 July – Jimmy Kennedy, songwriter (died 1984).
 21 July – William Bernard Barry, politician in the United States (died 1946 in the United States).
 16 August – Arthur Douglas, cricketer and rugby player (died 1937 in Northern Ireland).
 4 September – Patrick Lenihan, Fianna Fáil party TD (died 1970).
 11 September – Frank Ryan, member of the Irish Republican Army, editor of An Phoblacht, leftist activist and leader of Irish volunteers on the Republican side in the Spanish Civil War (died 1944).
 16 September – James Dillon, former leader of the Fine Gael party, TD and government minister (died 1986).
 2 October – Alexander Montagu, 10th Duke of Manchester, born Viscount Mandeville, British Royal Navy officer and hereditary peer (died 1977 in England).
 16 December – Billy King, cricketer (died 1987).
 29 December – Edward Pakenham, 6th Earl of Longford, politician, dramatist, and poet (died 1961).
 December – Maurice Gerard Moynihan, civil servant and writer (died 1999).
 Full date unknown
 Thekla Beere, civil servant (died 1991).
 Frank Carney, playwright and civil servant (died 1978).
 Maurice Gorham, journalist and broadcasting executive (died 1978).
 Patrick MacDonogh, poet (died 1961).

Deaths
 20 January – Aubrey Thomas de Vere, poet and critic (born 1814).
 12 February – Frederick Hamilton-Temple-Blackwood, 1st Marquess of Dufferin and Ava, politician, diplomat, and traveller (born 1826 in Florence).
 10 March – C. Y. O'Connor, engineer in Australia (born 1843).
 21 April – Ethna Carbery, writer and poet (born 1866).
 29 May – Edward Harrington, Member of Parliament (MP) for West Kerry 1885–1892 (born c.1852)
 20 July – John William Mackay, businessman in the United States (born 1831).
 22 July – Thomas Croke, Roman Catholic Archbishop of Cashel and Emly, founder patron of the Gaelic Athletic Association (born 1824).
 23 December – Lucius Gwynn, cricketer (born 1873).
 Full date unknown
 John O'Hart, genealogist (born 1824).

References

Ireland